The 2005 Campbell's Hall of Fame Championships was the 30th edition of the tennis tournament Hall of Fame Tennis Championships. It was played on outdoor grass courts at the International Tennis Hall of Fame in Newport, Rhode Island in the United States and was part of the ATP International Series of the 2005 ATP Tour. It took place from July 4 through July 10, 2005. Third-seeded Greg Rusedski won the final  over Vince Spadea.

Finals

Singles

 Greg Rusedski defeated  Vince Spadea 7–6(7–3), 2–6, 6–4
 It was Rusedski's only singles title of the year and the 15th and last of his career.

Doubles
 Jordan Kerr /  Jim Thomas defeated  Graydon Oliver /  Travis Parrott 7–6(7–5), 7–6(7–5)

References

External links
 

Hall of Fame Open
Campbell's Hall of Fame Tennis Championships
Campbell's Hall of Fame
Tennis tournaments in Rhode Island
 
Campbell's Hall of Fame Championships
Campbell's Hall of Fame Championships